Brush Creek is a  long 3rd order tributary to the Deep River in Randolph and Chatham Counties, North Carolina.

Course
Brush Creek rises about 1.5 miles west of Staley, North Carolina in Randolph County and then flows southerly briefly flowing into Chatham County before re-entering Randolph County and joining the Deep River about 1 mile west of Cheeks, North Carolina.

Watershed
Brush Creek drains  of area, receives about 47.6 in/year of precipitation, and has a wetness index of 417.16 and is about 53% forested.

See also
List of rivers of North Carolina

References

Rivers of North Carolina
Rivers of Chatham County, North Carolina
Rivers of Randolph County, North Carolina